Alex Hadley (born 14 September 1973)  is an Australian Paralympic swimmer from the United Kingdom. He was born in Staines, England. He competed but did not win any medals at the 1996 Atlanta Games. At the 2004 Athens Games, he won a gold medal in the Men's 4 × 100 m Medley 34 pts event and a silver medal in the Men's 4 × 100 m Freestyle 34 pts event. He also competed but did not win any medals at the 2008 Beijing Games.

References

Male Paralympic swimmers of Australia
Swimmers at the 1996 Summer Paralympics
Swimmers at the 2004 Summer Paralympics
Swimmers at the 2008 Summer Paralympics
Medalists at the 2004 Summer Paralympics
Paralympic gold medalists for Australia
Paralympic silver medalists for Australia
English emigrants to Australia
People from Staines-upon-Thames
1973 births
Living people
Paralympic medalists in swimming
Australian male freestyle swimmers
S7-classified Paralympic swimmers
Medalists at the World Para Swimming Championships
21st-century Australian people